PF-06260414 is a drug which acts as a selective androgen receptor modulator (SARM), and was developed for androgen replacement therapy.

See also 
 AC-262536
 ACP-105
 Enobosarm
 JNJ-28330835
 Ligandrol

References 

Selective androgen receptor modulators
Isoquinolines
Thiadiazinanes
Nitriles
Sulfones
Sulfur–nitrogen compounds